Saint-Amand is a former commune in the Manche department in Normandy in north-western France. On 1 January 2017, it was merged into the new commune Saint-Amand-Villages. It has 2,266 inhabitants (2019).

Heraldry

See also
Communes of the Manche department

References

Saintamand